Corydoras nanus is a tropical freshwater fish belonging to the Corydoradinae sub-family of the family Callichthyidae.  It originates in inland waters in South America, and is found in the Suriname and Maroni River basins in Suriname and the Iracoubo River basin in French Guiana.

This fish has been found in creeks with a moderate current, 0.5 to 3 m wide, shallow (20 cm to 50 cm depth) with sandy to sandy-muddy bottom and not brightly illuminated.  It will grow in length up to 1.7 inches (4.5 centimeters).  It lives in a tropical climate in water with a 6.0 – 8.0 pH, a water hardness of 2 – 25 dGH, and a temperature range of 72 – 79 °F (22 – 26 °C).  It feeds on worms, benthic crustaceans, insects, and plant matter.  It lays eggs in dense vegetation and adults do not guard the eggs.  In captivity, eggs have been deposited mostly on plant leaves.  The female may produce up to 600 eggs.

Corydoras nanus coloring is usually silver with black stripes running horizontally from head to tail. Occasionally they can have amber or purple highlights  in their coloring or a gray belly.

The common name for this fish is little Corydoras, where as its scientific name derives as "Cory=helmet", "doras=skin", and "nanus=dwarf".

If kept as a pet, the care level is relatively easy as the fish has a peaceful temperament. The aquarium should be well planted and have many places to hide. Use round gravel or smooth sand for the aquarium because the barbels can be damaged easily. A community of at least six fish is ideal.

Corydoras nanus is of commercial importance in the aquarium trade industry.

See also 
 List of freshwater aquarium fish species

References 

 

Corydoras
Fish of French Guiana
Fish of Suriname
Fish described in 1967